The Utkala Deepika was the first Odia printed newspaper. Therefore, 4 August is celebrated as Odia Journalism Day.

This weekly was instrumental in campaigning of bringing all Odia speaking tracts under a single province in India to develop the Odia language.

References

Weekly newspapers published in India
Odia-language newspapers